{|

|-
| Sunk:
| 1820
|-
| Raised:
| 6 March 1913
|-
| Restored:
| 1913, 1931–1943, 1963, 1988

|-
| 1813:

|-
| colspan = 2 | 1998:

{{Designation list
| embed = yes
| designation1 = NRHP
| designation1_offname = U.S.S. Niagara
| designation1_date = 11 April 1973
| designation1_number = 73001628
}}
|}

USS Niagara, commonly called the US Brig Niagara or the Flagship Niagara, is a wooden-hulled snow-brig that served as the relief flagship for Oliver Hazard Perry in the Battle of Lake Erie during the War of 1812. As the ship is certified for sail training by the United States Coast Guard, she is also designated SSV Niagara. Niagara is usually docked behind the Erie Maritime Museum in downtown Erie in the U.S. state of Pennsylvania as an outdoor exhibit for the museum. She also often travels the Great Lakes during the summer, serving as an ambassador of Pennsylvania when not docked. It was listed on the National Register of Historic Places in 1973 and was designated the official state ship of Pennsylvania by the Pennsylvania General Assembly in 1988.Niagara was constructed from 1812 to 1813 to protect the vulnerable American coastline on Lake Erie from the British and played a pivotal role in the battle for the lake. Along with most warships that served in the war, Niagara was sunk for preservation on Presque Isle in 1820. Raised in 1913, it was rebuilt for the centennial of the Battle of Lake Erie. After deteriorating, the restoration of Niagara was started again in the 1930s, but was hampered by the lack of funds caused by the Great Depression and remained uncompleted until 1963. A more extensive restoration was carried out in 1988 in which much of the original ship was largely destroyed. The incorporation of new materials and modern equipment makes it ambiguous as to whether it is or is not a replica.

 Naming 
In 1907, President Theodore Roosevelt issued an executive order standardizing the prefix of all vessels of the United States Navy to be "USS". Prior to this, ship prefixes were used "haphazardly", but ships' names were often preceded by the abbreviation "US" and the type of vessel. A survey of documents contained in the National Archives and Records Administration that were sent to and from the Department of the Navy in that era found a number of inconsistencies. Of 55 correspondences that mentioned Niagara, 43.6 percent used the term "US Sloop Niagara", 32.7 percent used "US Brig Niagara" and 23.6 percent had "USS Niagara".

Because of its historical role as the flagship of Oliver Hazard Perry during the Battle of Lake Erie, the ship is commonly referred to as the Flagship Niagara. Niagara also carries the name of "SSV Niagara" due to its designation by the United States Coast Guard as a Sailing School Vessel.

 Construction 
In the beginning of September 1812, Daniel Dobbins, a merchant on the Great Lakes, arrived in Washington, D.C. to warn the United States government of the vulnerability of the Lake Erie coastline to a British attack. Dobbins had been captured by the British after a surprise attack at Fort Mackinac in Michigan, but was able to negotiate his release. Dobbins was briefly detained again by the British in Detroit after the city was captured.
After several days of discussions with President James Madison and Secretary of the Navy Paul Hamilton, Dobbins convinced them that the safest place to build a fleet was in the sheltered bay formed by Presque Isle at Erie, Pennsylvania. On 15 September, Hamilton authorized Dobbins to construct four gunboats. Hamilton also granted $2,000 to be used for the construction and appointed Dobbins, a civilian, to the rank of sailing master in the United States Navy. On 31 December, Captain Isaac Chauncey, the commander of naval forces on Lake Ontario, arrived in Erie for a day, made some alterations to Dobbins' ship design and authorized him to build, additionally, two brigs. Oliver Hazard Perry was named chief naval officer in February 1813 and was given orders to report to Erie from Newport, Rhode Island. Perry arrived in Erie on 26 March, after being held up in Sackets Harbor, New York for two weeks by Chauncey in case of a possible attack by the British.

The construction of the fleet was largely supervised by Noah Brown, a shipwright brought in from New York City. The keels of two brigs were each constructed out of a single  black oak log. Due to a lack of iron, the timbers that made up the hulls were joined using wooden pins called treenails. In place of the oakum and pitch normally used to caulk ships, lead was used. The timbers used in the brigs were still green, as the builders did not have the luxury of time to allow the wood to dry properly.

One of the strategic advantages of building a fleet in Erie was that the bay formed by Presque Isle was cut off from the Lake Erie by a sandbar, which prevented British warships from being able to enter the bay. On 4 August, Niagara was pulled onto the sandbar using its anchor in a technique called kedging and was lightened by removing its cannons and ballast. A pair of  barges, called "camels", were placed on either side of the ship. The camels were sunk and secured to Niagara. The water was pumped out of the camel, lifting the ship. By the following day, Niagara was safely over the sandbar and was rearmed; Lawrence was floated over the sandbar a couple of days before Niagara. During the construction, the area was usually under daily surveillance by the British.

 War of 1812 
Lieutenant Daniel Turner was placed in command of Niagara for the cruise, as the fleet was still seriously undermanned; Dobbins had even written a letter, directed to Secretary Hamilton, out of desperation back in December 1812. Word arrived on 8 August that Jesse Elliott was en route to Erie from Black Rock, New York with 89 men. Elliott was promoted to Master Commandant in July, and was given command of Niagara after arriving in Erie on 10 August.

On 17 August, Perry's fleet anchored off of Sandusky, Ohio, and dispatched a boat to inform General William Henry Harrison of their presence. Harrison and his staff met with Perry aboard the ships the next day and agreed to a rendezvous in Put-in-Bay. In Put-in-Bay, Harrison made available 100 "Kentucky and frontier riflemen" to serve on board as Marines. The British fleet, under the command of Commodore Robert Heriot Barclay, was based at Fort Amherstburg, Canada. Unbeknownst to Perry, supplies in Fort Amherstburg were running out, as his fleet had cut off shipments from Long Point. Fearing an uprising caused by a shortage of food, Barclay and his fleet set sail as soon as Detroit was complete.

 Battle of Lake Erie 
thumb|Painting by William Henry Powell depicting Perry's transfer to Niagara during the Battle of Lake Erie.
On 10 September, both fleets got underway. Detroit fired the first shot around noon, while still out of range. As the line moved to engage, Niagara, under the command of Elliott, lagged behind the fleet. The cause of the failure of Niagara to maintain formation is unknown, either deliberate on the part of Elliott, or because it was becalmed. After a couple of hours, all of the cannons on Lawrence that were facing the British were out of commission and the brig could no longer be maneuvered. Perry lowered his battle flag, emblazoned with the last words of Captain James Lawrence, "Don't Give Up The Ship", and transferred to the still-intact Niagara via a small rowboat. Perry took command of Niagara and crossed the British line perpendicularly in a tactic called crossing the "T". Queen Charlotte, while attempting to prevent Niagara from breaking through the line, collided with Detroit and became entangled. Niagara opened fire with both broadsides: the starboard broadside hitting Queen Charlotte and Detroit, and the port into Lady Prevost. After several broadsides, Queen Charlotte surrendered, followed shortly after by Detroit and the rest of the British fleet.

After the battle, Niagara assisted in the transporting of Harrison's army to the mouth of the Detroit River in preparation for an invasion of southwest Ontario. On 25 April 1814, command of Niagara was transferred to Arthur Sinclair. After repairs, the fleet—consisting of Niagara, Lawrence, Caledonia, Scorpion and Tigress—departed Erie for Detroit. In Detroit, soldiers under the command of Colonel George Croghan embarked with the fleet, bound for Mackinac Island. The fleet arrived on 26 July and landed on 4 August. The battle was ultimately lost, with Croghan being forced to retreat back to his boats. On 13 August, the fleet arrived at the mouth of the Nottawasaga River where they attacked a blockhouse owned by the North West Company. The blockhouse was destroyed by the British, along with the schooner HMS Nancy, to prevent their supplies from being captured.

After the Treaty of Ghent was signed, ending the war, the majority of the surviving ships that participated in the Battle of Lake Erie were disposed of in 1815. Queen Charlotte, Detroit, and Lawrence were sunk for preservation in Misery Bay on Presque Isle, whereas Niagara was kept afloat and operated as a receiving ship. It was sunk in 1820 when the naval station at Presque Isle was closed. Benjamin H. Brown of Rochester, New York bought all four ships in 1825, but sold them in 1836 to George Miles of Erie. Miles raised the ships, planning on using them as merchant vessels. Lawrence and  Niagara, not having a large enough hold and being in poor condition, were allowed to sink again.

 Centennial 

As part of celebrations for the centennial of the Battle of Lake Erie, Niagara was raised from Misery Bay in April 1913. Its keel was found to be in good enough condition for the brig to be rebuilt. Efforts to rebuild Niagara were hampered by the lack of original plans. The restored Niagara was launched on 7 June, complete with a new bowsprit, rigging and reproduction cannons supplied by the Boston Navy Yard. From mid-July to mid-September, Niagara was towed to various ports on the Great Lakes—including Milwaukee, Chicago, Detroit, Buffalo and Cleveland—by USS Wolverine, the Navy's first iron-hulled warship. Ownership of Niagara was transferred to the City of Erie in 1917, where it remained docked and deteriorating.

The City of Erie transferred ownership of Niagara to the newly formed "USS Niagara Foundation" in 1929, which was tasked with "acquiring and restoring the ship and making it the centerpiece of a museum." The onset of the Great Depression forced the Commonwealth of Pennsylvania to take ownership, through the Flagship Niagara Commission, two years later. $50,000 was made available for another restoration in 1931, but by 1938 the state stopped its funding, leaving the restoration unfinished. Niagara was transferred to the Pennsylvania Historical Commission, predecessor of the Pennsylvania Historical and Museum Commission, and became a project for the Works Progress Administration. The Historical Commission contracted Howard I. Chapelle to draw up plans for another restoration of Niagara, based on other period ships that were built by Noah Brown, like . According to Chapelle, very little of the original Niagara remained, as parts of it had been sold as souvenirs, and the 1913 reconstruction was not accurate to the period. The hull of Niagara was launched in October 1943 without any masts, spars, or rigging. It was placed in a concrete cradle in 1951. Discovery of dry rot throughout every part of Niagara made it clear that a complete reconstruction would eventually be needed. Funds were appropriated by the Pennsylvania Historical and Museum Commission to make Niagara "presentable" for the sesquicentennial of the Battle of Lake Erie in 1963 with the addition of rigging and cannons. Niagara was listed on the National Register of Historic Places on 11 April 1973.

Museum ship

In 1981, the Flagship Niagara League was formed with intent of reconstructing Niagara so that it would be a working ship, instead of an "outdoor museum piece". The League was eventually incorporated as a non-profit organization associated with the Pennsylvania Historical and Museum Commission. Melbourne Smith, builder of the schooner , was hired in 1986 by the Pennsylvania Historical and Museum Commission to head the reconstruction. The decay of Niagara was so bad that it was dismantled and ultimately destroyed, with various timbers salvaged and used in non-structural areas of the ship. The destruction of the old ship and use of new wood often leads Niagara to be considered a replica.  While the first Niagara was built hurriedly, the new Niagara was built out of properly seasoned and preserved yellow pine and Douglas fir. The new Niagara was launched on 10 September 1988, but was not completed until 18 July 1990 when its sea trials were held. The Pennsylvania General Assembly designated Niagara as the official flagship of Pennsylvania on 29 April 1988 and described its purpose as being a "sailing ambassador for Pennsylvania". In March 2008, the yellow pine mainmast was replaced with one of Douglas fir.

The United States Coast Guard certified Niagara as a Sailing School Vessel in August 2005. For safety reasons, Niagara was equipped with modern equipment such as auxiliary diesel engines, lifeboats, radar, LORAN and radio. In 2009, the Flagship Niagara League assumed day-to-day management of  Niagara after a decision by the Pennsylvania Historical and Museum Commission to cut $250,000 to fill a budget deficit. As part of the bicentennial of the Battle of Lake Erie, Niagara took part in a reenactment of the battle on 2 September 2013 in Put-In-Bay along with 16 other tall ships.

 In popular culture 

In 1996, a commemorative Pennsylvania license plate was introduced depicting Niagara during the Battle of Lake Erie. Concerns by law enforcement about the plates' legibility led them to be no longer issued.

In 2010, Niagara was used to depict the whaleship  in an episode of the Public Broadcasting Service documentary series American Experience.

 See also 

 List of Pennsylvania state symbols
 National Register of Historic Places listings in Erie County, Pennsylvania

 Notes 

a. Niagara's captain's blog, Captain Heerssen explains the vessel's historical name, adding that "the US Coast Guard has designated her as the Sailing School Vessel Niagara due to the nature of service in which she is routinely engaged." Retrieved 22 July 2011.
b. Although commonly referred to as a brig, she is technically a snow, as her spanker is rigged to a small try-mast, a.k.a. snow-mast, stepped abaft her main.

 References 

 Sources 

 
 
 
 
 
 
  
 
 

 External links 
 Flagship Niagara website
 Niagara (Dictionary of American Naval Fighting Ships'')

1813 ships
Great Lakes ships
Museum ships in Pennsylvania
Museums in Erie, Pennsylvania
Ships on the National Register of Historic Places in Pennsylvania
Ships built in Pennsylvania
Symbols of Pennsylvania
Tall ships of the United States
Brigs of the United States Navy
War of 1812 ships of the United States
National Register of Historic Places in Erie County, Pennsylvania
Scuttled vessels